Acalyptris pseudohastatus is a moth of the family Nepticulidae. It was described by Puplesis and Diškus in 2002. It is known from premontane rainforest in the Napo region of Ecuador.

References

Nepticulidae
Endemic fauna of Ecuador
Moths of South America
Moths described in 2002